Yampil is an urban-type settlement in Sumy Oblast in Ukraine. It was formerly the administrative center of Yampil Raion, and is now administered within Shostka Raion. It is located on the Ptushok River, a tributary of the Ivotka River in the basin of the Dnieper. Population:

Economy

Transportation
The settlement has road access to Shostka and to Hlukhiv where there is further access to Kyiv.

Ivotka railway station is just outside of the settlement border. It is on the railway connecting Konotop with Zernove railway station in Seredyna-Buda. There is local passenger traffic.

References

Urban-type settlements in Shostka Raion
Glukhovsky Uyezd